Zalesie  is a village in the administrative district of Gmina Zduny, within Łowicz County, Łódź Voivodeship, in central Poland.

See also
There are a number of villages by the same name in the Łódź Voivodeship area. For their locations see the gminas of Drużbice, Kodrąb, Wartkowice, Wielgomłyny, Zadzim, Zelów, as well as the powiats of Brzeziny, Kutno, Łask, Skierniewice, and Tomaszów.

References

 Central Statistical Office (GUS) Population: Size and Structure by Administrative Division - (2007-12-31) (in Polish)

Villages in Łowicz County